Csaba Dióssi (born 11 November 1969) is a Hungarian politician, member of the National Assembly (MP) for Dunakeszi (Pest County Constituency III) between 2010 and 2014. He was a member of the Economic and Information Technology Committee from 14 May 2010 to 5 May 2014.

Dióssi is the current mayor of Dunakeszi since 2010. Previously he served as deputy mayor between 2007 and 2010.

References

1969 births
Living people
Fidesz politicians
Members of the National Assembly of Hungary (2010–2014)
Mayors of places in Hungary
Politicians from Budapest